Amer Alwan (born 1957 in Babylon, Iraq) is an Iraqi French film director. Alwan was forced to shoot his movie Zaman, The Man From The Reeds on videotape, as when Iraq was under severe economic sanctions the United Nations and United States, would not allow Iraq to import 35 and 16 millimeter film stocks, because they believed that the materials contained some chemicals that could have been used to produce weapons of mass destruction. So, he then transfer it to 35-millimeter film when he went back to Paris, where he has lived since 1980. He also had issues dealing with the Iraqi government censors. The film was shown at several film festivals in Europe, Latin America as well as the United States.

Filmography
 2003 - Zaman, The Man From The Reeds (Zaman, l'homme des roseaux)

Awards
 San Sebastián International Film Festival Future Talent Award for Zaman, The Man From The Reeds

References

External links

 "ZAMAN,the man who lives in the reeds" a film by Amer Alwan 2003

1957 births
Living people
Iraqi film directors
People from Hillah
French people of Iraqi descent